Harlan Smokies was the primary name of a minor league baseball team based in Harlan, Kentucky. The team complete for a total of 11 seasons during 1948–1965, first in the Mountain States League and later in the Appalachian League. The team was known as the Harlan Yankees in 1963 and Harlan Red Sox in 1965, due to affiliations with the New York Yankees and Boston Red Sox of Major League Baseball.

The Smokies qualified for the Mountain States League postseason in four consecutive seasons, 1949–1952, and were league champions in three of those years (1949, 1950, and 1952).

Notable players
Multiple players with Harlan also made appearances in Major League Baseball:

 1948: —
 1949: —
 1950: Roger McCardell
 1951: —
 1952: —
 1953: Cliff Melton
 1954: —

 1961: Cisco Carlos, Mike DeGerick, Art López, Luis Peraza, Mel Stottlemyre
 1962: Fred Klages, Dave McDonald, Denny McLain, John Miller, Billy Murphy, Cecil Perkins, Jim Shellenback
 1963: Mike Jurewicz, Jim Ollom, Fritz Peterson, Dale Roberts, Charlie Vinson
 1965: Ray Jarvis, Bobby Mitchell, Amos Otis

Results by season

 In 1954, the Mountain States League disbanded in July, thus no playoffs were held.

References

Further reading

External links
 Harlan Smokies history at harlancountysports.com

Baseball teams established in 1948
Baseball teams disestablished in 1965
1948 establishments in Kentucky
1965 disestablishments in Kentucky
Defunct minor league baseball teams
Defunct baseball teams in Kentucky
Defunct Mountain States League (1948–1954) teams
Boston Braves minor league affiliates

Chicago White Sox minor league affiliates
New York Yankees minor league affiliates
Smokies